Sebastian Cruz (born July 31, 2000) is an American professional soccer player who plays for the Cal State Fullerton Titans.

Career
Cruz played with United Soccer League side Swope Park Rangers during their 2018 season from Sporting Kansas City's academy. He made his first professional appearance on March 24, 2018, as an injury-time substitute during a 4-2 win over Seattle Sounders FC 2.

References

External links 
 Sporting KC profile
 
 Cal State Fullerton bio

2000 births
Living people
American soccer players
Sporting Kansas City II players
Association football midfielders
Soccer players from California
People from Fresno County, California
USL Championship players
Cal State Fullerton Titans men's soccer players
De Anza Force players